KRT82 is a keratin gene. This is a type II keratin and appears to be a hair cuticle-specific.

References